Jeong Ho-jin (born 6 August 1999) is a South Korean footballer who plays as a midfielder for Suwon Samsung Bluewings, on loan from Jeonnam Dragons.

Career statistics

Club

References

1999 births
Living people
South Korean footballers
South Korea under-20 international footballers
Association football midfielders
Korea University alumni
K League 2 players
K League 1 players
Jeonnam Dragons players
Suwon Samsung Bluewings players